The 2008 United States Senate election in Wyoming took place on November 4, 2008. Incumbent Republican U.S. Senator Mike Enzi won re-election to a third term.

Democratic primary

Candidates 
 Chris Rothfuss, chemical engineer and university professor
 Al Hamburg, perennial candidate

Results

Republican primary

Candidates 
 Mike Enzi, incumbent U.S. Senator

Results

General election

Candidates 
 Mike Enzi (R), incumbent U.S. Senator
 Chris Rothfuss (D), chemical engineer and university professor

Predictions

Polling

Results

See also 
 2008 United States Senate elections

References

External links 
 Elections from the Wyoming Secretary of State
 U.S. Congress candidates for Wyoming at Project Vote Smart
 2008 Wyoming Senate race from CQ Politics
 Wyoming U.S. Senate race - Class I Class II from 2008 Race Tracker
 Campaign contributions for Wyoming congressional races from OpenSecrets
 Official campaign websites
 Mike Enzi, Republican incumbent candidate (Class II)
 Chris Rothfuss, Democratic candidate (Class II)

2008
Wyoming
United States Senate